The economy of Iran has been stagnated for several years since the Islamic Revolution. The economic recession was intensified in early 1990s. Thus, it is necessary to make serious decisions in processing macroeconomic variables. In early 2010s, the real GDP  trend experienced serious changes, and the economic recession was intensified with a drop in oil prices and the subsequent reduction in domestic and foreign exchange earnings. In economic literature, the overall macroeconomic performance deviation from the long-term growth is called the business cycle. Clearly, a better understanding of recession in the economy of Iran is crucial in economic policies.

Efforts have been made to explain and define recession so that the proposed definitions would reflect some relevant theories. Although the business cycles  are different in terms of duration and intensity, they usually have common features including production, employment, real income and real sales which increase or decrease simultaneously. On the other hand, some economic variables as leading indicators suggest the creation of a cycle in future before intensification of a business cycle. These variables include the number of working hours, real contracts, the volumes of orders in the manufacturing sector, number of started buildings, changes in the money supply, changes in the credits and changes in some of the sensitive prices. The use of variables to identify boom and recession periods can be differently important. This has been investigated in economic studies using different econometric methods.

Signs of a Recession 
The standard macroeconomic definition of a recession is two consecutive quarters of negative GDP growth. Private business, which had been in expansion prior to the recession, scales back production and tries to limit exposure to systematic risk. Measurable levels of spending and investment are likely to drop and a natural downward pressure on prices may occur as aggregate demand slumps.

At the microeconomic level, firms experience declining margins during a recession. When revenue, whether from sales or investment, declines, firms look to cut their least-efficient activities. A firm might stop producing low-margin products or reduce employee compensation. It might also renegotiate with creditors to obtain temporary interest relief. Unfortunately, declining margins often force businesses to fire less productive employees.

Causes of Recession in Iran’s Economy 
Causes of reduced real growth of the country's economic activities can be generally evaluated in terms of supply-side and demand-side evolutions. As far as current recession (economic downturn) is concerned, evolutions in the demand side play a greater role as compared with the previous recessionary situations. Recording a growth of -5.8 percent in 2012, Iran's economy experienced the steepest recession since the end of Iran-Iraq War. Although, in the first half of 2013, Iran's economic growth, with a slight change, recorded a rate of -3.1 percent, negative economic growth figures have been recorded ever since. Now the important questions are: What are the main causes of the recent severe recession in Iran? And what conditions and time horizons are required to come out of this recession?

Economic sanctions, including oil embargoes, financial sanctions and sanctions imposed against Iranian companies, can be collectively cited as the most important causes of the severe recession in Iran in the recent years; and are the major contributors to the persistence of this recession. These sanctions have contributed to Iran's economic downturn (recession) in several ways, including the sharp decline in oil revenues, exchange rate jumps and the volatility thereof, dominance of a multi-rate exchange system, limitations imposed on financial and commodity exchanges with foreign countries (as a result of sanctions), increased risks and uncertainty, and decreased economic security.

Sharp Decline in Oil Revenues 
Experience has shown that the Iran's production and economic growth response to fluctuations in oil revenues is asymmetrical. In other words, reduced oil revenues leave a greater impact on production and economic growth than increased oil revenues. When oil revenues are high, the country's economy is afloat, but as soon as a substantial reduction in oil revenues occurs, the economy faces a negative shock followed by a sharp decline in economic growth. Accordingly, oil embargoes-through sharply reducing oil revenues – have had a severe recessionary impact on the Iranian economy during the last two years.

Exchange Rate Jumps and Volatility 
Although exchange rate jumps can – through increasing competitiveness of domestic producers with foreign competitors in both domestic and foreign markets – help to increase production and improve economic growth, they can also introduce severe recessionary effects by sharply increasing production costs. The important point in this regard is that the negative effects caused by rising production costs affect the economy quickly and strongly; whereas the positive effects associated with increasing competitiveness are gradual and manifested over time.

In addition to exchange rate jumps, currency volatility has had recessionary impacts by creating extensive economic uncertainties. Therefore, in the short run, exchange rate jumps and volatility have left their ultimate quick and strong recessionary impacts on the country's economy.

Imposed Limitations on Commodity and Financial Exchanges with Foreign Countries 
Oil embargo is only one aspect of the newly imposed economic sanctions on Iran. Financial sanctions imposed on Iran's banking system, especially those on Iran Central Bank, and the other sanctions imposed by a number of foreign companies have made Iran's financial and commodity exchanges with foreign countries much more difficult, time-consuming, and costly; and, at times, virtually impossible. In fact, in the current situation, quantitative restrictions in foreign trading have more destructive effects than price restrictions of exchange rate. For example, the impossibility of importing certain spare parts can cause severe problems in certain industries; an obvious example being Iran's automotive industry. Due to the broad commodity and financial transactions between Iran and foreign countries, this would naturally have a severe recessionary effect on Iran's economy.

Increased Risk, Uncertainty, and Decreased Economic Security 
One of the requirements for economic boom and growth in any country is the dominance of reliability and providing economic security for economic actors. Intensified economic sanctions and increased tensions in foreign relations through economic uncertainty, as well as weak economic security, have increased the risk of investment in production. Naturally, this situation finally left its negative effects on Iran's national production and investment potentials.

References

Recessions
Economy of Iran